The Desnățui is a left tributary of the river Danube in Romania. It discharges into the Danube near Bistreț, after passing through the Bistreț reservoir. It flows through the villages Gvardinița, Cleanov, Gubaucea, Sălcuța, Ciutura, Fântânele, Radovan, Lipovu, Cerăt, Giurgița, Bârca, Goicea and Bistreț.

Tributaries

The following rivers are tributaries to the river Desnățui (from source to mouth):

Left: Burduhosul, Ciutura, Terpezița, Valea Rea, Buzat
Right: Olteanca, Gârbov, Putinei, Bănaguiu, Băldal, Baboia

References

Rivers of Romania
Rivers of Dolj County
Rivers of Mehedinți County